The A258 road is an A road in England, running through East Kent from Dover to Sandwich.  It is in Zone 2 of the Great Britain numbering scheme.

It begins at the A256 within Dover, running up Castle Hill and passing Dover Castle on its eastern side and the Duke of York's Royal Military School on its western side.  It then crosses the A2 at a four-way roundabout (called Guston Roundabout) at the top of Jubilee Way before running behind the East Kent coast, with turn-offs to Westcliffe, Martin Mill and St Margaret's at Cliffe. 
 
It then runs through Ringwould (passing Ripple Mill), Walmer and Deal.  
Whilst in Deal it is named 'the Strand' and it passes Deal Castle, then becomes part of a one-way traffic system in Deal, it heads up 'Victoria Road', then right onto 'Ranelagh Road' then left onto 'Prince of Wales Terrace' (beside the coastline). 'Deal Castle Road' leads back to the Ringwould/Dover route.
The route heads away from the coast on 'Broad Street', where it crosses over the pedestrianised high street and becoming 'Queen Street'. It passes over the railway close to Deal Railway station . Then it becomes 'London Road' heading to Upper Deal. Then it heads north-west, passing Sholden and later Betteshanger Park. It is once again called the A258, passing through the hamlet of Hacklinge and past the junction to Finglesham and then the junction to Worth.  When it reaches the southern part of Sandwich, near Woodnesborough, it terminates at another junction with the A256 (Sandwich By-pass) at Stone Cross.

Improvements
In 2006, improvement works were carried out to the A2(T)/A258 Guston Roundabout Junction, Dover. This meant the road from Deal was widened at the junction to allow for more queuing on the road.

References

External links
 Kentish rollercoaster (blog about driving on the A258

Roads in Kent